Jean-Claude Decosse (born 6 July 1949) is a French racewalker. He competed in the men's 50 kilometres walk at the 1972 Summer Olympics.

References

1949 births
Living people
Athletes (track and field) at the 1972 Summer Olympics
French male racewalkers
Olympic athletes of France
Place of birth missing (living people)